Lime Lake is a lake in Murray County, in the U.S. state of Minnesota.

Lime Lake was named for the natural limestone in and around the lake.

See also
List of lakes in Minnesota

References

Lakes of Minnesota
Lakes of Murray County, Minnesota